The 1874 Hackney by-election was fought on 24 April 1874.  The byelection was fought due to the void Election of the incumbent Liberal MP, John Holms.  It was retained by Holms.

References

Hackney by-election
Hackney by-election
Hackney,1874
Hackney,1874